The St George region of Sydney is part of the southern suburbs of Sydney, in the state of New South Wales, Australia. The area includes all the suburbs in the local government area of Georges River Council and the part of Bayside Council which was Rockdale City prior to 2016. The eastern boundary of the district is Lady Robinson Beach on Botany Bay. The name "St George" derives from the cadastral Parish of St George (used for land title purposes), and the area was later covered by the St George County Council, the electricity supplier for the councils in this region. While generally being considered part of Southern Sydney the area is occasionally included as part of the Inner South-West.

History

Indigenous Australians 
The first inhabitants of the St George area were Australian Aboriginals.  At the time of the arrival of the First Fleet,  the Eora tribe inhabited land from Port Jackson to Botany Bay and the Georges River. There is evidence to suggest that these people belonged to the Gweagal, Bidjigal and Cadigal clans.

European settlement 

James Cook sailed HMS Endeavour into Botany Bay in 1770 for his first landing on the continent of Australia. Captain Arthur Phillip led the First Fleet into the bay on 18 January 1788 to found a penal colony there but found the sandy infertile soil disappointing and moved the site of the settlement north to the natural harbour of Port Jackson. The ridge between the Cooks River and Georges River was covered in a dense forest which first attracted timber cutters to the area. Wood gatherers, bark collectors, sawyers and charcoal burners moved into the area to work the forests of Simeon Lord and supply Sydney’s timber needs. By the 1840s, Major Mitchell was building the Illawarra Road (now Forest Road) on the ridge through ‘Lord’s Bush’, which required enormous amounts of trees and bush to be cleared. Irishman Michael Gannon was innkeeper at Cooks River in the 1840s. He acquired land in the area, part of which became known as ‘Gannons Forest’ which later was the centre of Hurstville. By 1851, it was estimated that 50 to 100 carts of timber and lime crossed the Cooks River daily.

St George Parish was one of the original parishes within Cumberland County. It is one of nine parishes named after saints, of which only St George and St James are still commonly used as place names. The recipients were William Packer, Josh Thorp, James Oatley, Hannah Laycock, F. W. Unwin, Reuben and David Hannam, Patrick Moore, J. Beehag, John Porter and the larger grants were James Chandler and John and Robert Townson. The parish also covers the former City of Canterbury, now the eastern part of the City of Canterbury-Bankstown, although most customary references to the "St George area" today do not include that part of the parish.

In 1920, the local councils in the St George area constituted St George County Council, to deal with distribution of electricity in the region. St George County Council was merged with Sydney County Council (another inter-council electricity supplier) to form "Sydney Electricity" in 1989.

The regional identity was reinforced by the creation in 1949 of a federal electorate, the Division of St George, in the area. The Division was abolished in 1993. The area's identity is reflected in the name of the St George Illawarra Dragons team who play in the National Rugby League, and the St. George Bank.

Suburbs in St George Area

Culture and sport
The St George area is a culturally diverse region. Major centres feature a substantial number of Southern European and Asian migrants and their families.

In terms of sport, the area is known as the home of the St George Illawarra Dragons and the St George District Cricket Club.

Commercial areas
The biggest commercial areas in the St George area are located at Hurstville, Kogarah and Rockdale. Hurstville is the largest central business district in southern Sydney and features a large shopping centre called Westfield Hurstville. Additionally Rockdale features another large shopping centre, Rockdale Plaza.

Transport
The St. George Area is serviced very well by public transport. The Eastern Suburbs & Illawarra Line, South Coast Line and Airport Line have frequent services to the city directly or via Wolli Creek.

There are also abundant bus routes serving the region operated by Transit Systems, Punchbowl Bus Company and Transdev NSW.

Population
The population of the St George region, as estimated in 2020, was 285,214.

St. George name
Several major local institutions have 'St. George' in their title:

 St. George Asian Business Association
 St. George Bank
 St. George Basketball Association
 St. George College, TAFE NSW Sydney Institute
 St. George & Sutherland Community College
 St George AFC
 St. George Dragons District Junior Rugby League
 St. George Girls High School
 St George Christian School
 St George Cricket Club
 St. George Hospital
 St. George Illawarra Dragons (NRL Rugby league Team)St. George Leagues Club
 St. George Masonic Club
 St George Model Boat Club
 St. George Motor Boat Club
 St George Rowing Club
 St. George Rugby Union Club
 St. George Sailing Club
 St. George Soccer Football Association
 St George and Sutherland Shire Leader newspaper

References

 
Regions of Sydney
Georges River